The 1966 World Chess Championship was played between Tigran Petrosian and Boris Spassky in Moscow from April 9 to June 9, 1966. Petrosian won.

1964 Interzonal Tournament

An interzonal tournament was held in Amsterdam in the Netherlands in May and June 1964. Six spots in the Candidates tournament were on the line.

{| class="wikitable"
|+ 1964 Interzonal Tournament
|-
!  !! !! 1 !! 2 !! 3 !! 4 !! 5 !! 6 !! 7 !! 8 !! 9 !! 10 !! 11 !! 12 !! 13 !! 14 !! 15 !! 16 !! 17 !! 18 !! 19 !! 20 !! 21 !! 22 !! 23 !! 24 !! Total
|- style="background:#ccffcc;"
| 1 || align=left| || – || ½ || ½ || ½ || ½ || ½ || ½ || ½ || 1 || 1 || 1 || 1 || ½ || 1 || ½ || ½ || ½ || ½ || 1 || 1 || 1 || 1 || 1 || 1 || 17
|- style="background:#ccffcc;"
| 2 || align=left| || ½ || – || 1 || ½ || 0 || 1 || 0 || ½ || 1 || ½ || 1 || 1 || 1 || ½ || ½ || ½ || 1 || 1 || ½ || 1 || 1 || 1 || 1 || 1 || 17
|- style="background:#ccffcc;"
| 3 ||  || ½ || 0 || – || ½ || ½ || ½ || ½ || 1 || 1 || 1 || 0 || ½ || 1 || ½ || 1 || 1 || ½ || 1 || 1 || 1 || 1 || 1 || 1 || 1 || 17
|- style="background:#ccffcc;"
| 4 || align=left| || ½ || ½ || ½ || – || ½ || ½ || ½ || ½ || ½ || ½ || ½ || ½ || 1 || 1 || 1 || 1 || ½ || 1 || 1 || 1 || 1 || 1 || 1 || 1 || 17
|-
| 5 || align=left| || ½ || 1 || ½ || ½ || – || 0 || 1 || ½ || 0 || 1 || ½ || 1 || ½ || 1 || 1 || 1 || 1 || ½ || ½ || ½ || 1 || 1 || 1 || 1 || 16½ 
|-
| 6 || align=left| || ½ || 0 || ½ || ½ || 1 || – || ½ || ½ || ½ || ½ || 1 || ½ || ½ || 1 || ½ || ½ || 1 || 1 || 1 || ½ || 1 || 1 || 1 || 1 || 16 
|- style="background:#ccffcc;"
| 7 || align=left| || ½ || 1 || ½ || ½ || 0 || ½ || – || ½ || ½ || ½ || 0 || 1 || 1 || ½ || ½ || ½ || ½ || 1 || 1 || 1 || ½ || 1 || 1 || 1 || 15 
|-
| 8 || align=left| || ½ || ½ || 0 || ½ || ½ || ½ || ½ || – || ½ || ½ || ½ || ½ || ½ || 1 || ½ || ½ || 1 || ½ || ½ || 1 || 1 || 1 || 1 || 1 || 14½
|- style="background:#ccffcc;"
| 9 || align=left| || 0 || 0 || 0 || ½ || 1 || ½ || ½ || ½ || – || ½ || 0 || ½ || ½ || 1 || 1 || 1 || ½ ||1  || ½ || 1 || 1 || 1 || 1 || 1 || 14½
|-
| 10 || align=left| || 0 || ½ || 0 || ½ || 0 || ½ || ½ || ½ || ½ || – || ½ || 1 || 1 || ½ || 1 || ½ || 1 || ½ || 1 || 1 || 0 || 1 || 1 || 1 || 14 
|-
| 11 || align=left| || 0 || 0 || 1 || ½ || ½ || 0 || 1 || ½ || 1 || ½ || – || 0 || ½ || 1 || ½ || 1 || ½ || ½ || 1 || 1 || ½ || ½ || 1 || ½ || 13½ 
|-
| 12 || align=left| || 0 || 0 || ½ || ½ || 0 || ½ || 0 || ½ || ½ || 0 || 1 || – || ½ || ½ || 1 || ½ || 1 || ½ || ½ || 1 || 1 || 1 || 1 || 1 || 13  
|-
| 13 ||  || ½ || 0 || 0 || 0 || ½ || ½ || 0 || ½ || ½ || 0 || ½ || ½ || – || ½ || 1 || ½ || 1 || 1 || 1 || 1 || 1 || 1 || ½ || ½ || 12½ 
|-
| 14 ||  || 0 || ½ || ½ || 0 || 0 || 0 || ½ || 0 || 0 || ½ || 0 || ½ || ½ || – || 1 || ½ || 0 || 1 || 1 || 1 || ½ || ½ || 1 || ½ || 10 
|-
| 15 ||  || ½ || ½ || 0 || 0 || 0 || ½ || ½ || ½ || 0 || 0 || ½ || 0 || 0 || 0 || – || ½ || 1 || ½ || ½ || 1 || ½ || ½ || 1 || 1 || 9½ 
|-
| 16 ||  || ½ || ½ || 0 || 0 || 0 || ½ || ½ || ½ || 0 || ½ || 0 || ½ || ½ || ½ || ½ || – || ½ || 0 || 1 || 0 || 1 || ½ || ½ || ½ || 9  
|-
| 17 ||  || ½ || 0 || ½ || ½ || 0 || 0 || ½ || 0 || ½ || 0 || ½ || 0 || 0 || 1 || 0 || ½ || – || ½ || ½ || ½ || 0 || 1 || 0 || 1 || 8 
|-
| 18 ||  || ½ || 0 || 0 || 0 || ½ || 0 || 0 || ½ || 0 || ½ || ½ || ½ || 0 || 0 || ½ || 1 || ½ || – || 0 || 0 || 1 || 1 || 0 || 1 || 8 
|-
| 19 ||  || 0 || ½ || 0 || 0 || ½ || 0 || 0 || ½ || ½ || 0 || 0 || ½ || 0 || 0 || ½ || 0 || ½ || 1 || – || ½ || 1 || 1 || ½ || ½ || 8 
|-
| 20 ||  || 0 || 0 || 0 || 0 || ½ || ½ || 0 || 0 || 0 || 0 || 0 || 0 || 0 || 0 || 0 || 1 || ½ || 1 || ½ || – || ½ || 1 || ½ || 1 || 7 
|-
| 21 ||  || 0 || 0 || 0 || 0 || 0 || 0 || ½ || 0 || 0 || 1 || ½ || 0 || 0 || ½ || ½ || 0 || 1 || 0 || 0 || ½ || – || 0 || ½ || ½ || 5½ 
|-
| 22 ||  || 0 || 0 || 0 || 0 || 0 || 0 || 0 || 0 || 0 || 0 || ½ || 0 || 0 || ½ || ½ || ½ || 0 || 0 || 0 || 0 || 1 || – || 1 || 1 || 5 
|-
| 23 ||  || 0 || 0 || 0 || 0 || 0 || 0 || 0 || 0 || 0 || 0 || 0 || 0 || ½ || 0 || 0 || ½ || 1 || 1 || ½ || ½ || ½ || 0 || – || 0 || 4½ 
|-
| 24 ||  || 0 || 0 || 0 || 0 || 0 || 0 || 0 || 0 || 0 || 0 || ½ || 0 || ½ || ½ || 0 || ½ || 0 || 0 || ½ || 0 || ½ || 0 || 1 || – || 4 
|}

Since FIDE rules only allowed a maximum of three players from the same nation to qualify from the interzonal, Stein and Bronstein were ineligible. Instead Ivkov qualified. The sixth and final place in the Candidates Tournament was decided in a 4-game playoff in which Portisch beat Reshevsky 2½–½.

Bobby Fischer, the winner of the previous Interzonal in 1962, declined his invitation, despite qualifying by winning the 1963–64 US Championship.

1965 Candidates matches

After the controversy surrounding the previous Candidates tournament, the 1965 tournament was the first to be played as a knock-out series of matches.

Two players were seeded directly into the tournament: Mikhail Botvinnik (loser of the last championship match) and Paul Keres (2nd place in the 1962 Candidates). Botvinnik declined, and his place was taken by Efim Geller, who finished 3rd in the 1962 Candidates.

Spassky won, earning the right to challenge champion Petrosian for the title.

Larsen and Geller played a third place playoff in Copenhagen, Denmark in March 1966. Larsen won 5–4.

1966 Championship match

The match was played as best of 24 games, with the champion (Petrosian) retaining the title in the event of a 12–12 tie.

While Petrosian retained the title with a 12–10 lead after Game 22, he and Spassky decided to play the final two games anyway.

This was the first World Chess Championship match since 1934 in which the reigning World Chess Champion defeated his opponent.

References

External links
1966 World Chess Championship at the Internet Archive record of Graeme Cree's Chess Pages

1966
1966 in chess
1966 in Russia
1966 in Soviet sport
Chess in the Soviet Union
1966 in Moscow